Johnny Washbrook (born October 16, 1944) is a Canadian-American film and television actor. He is known for playing the role of Ken McLaughlin in the American western television series My Friend Flicka.

Life and career 
Washbrook was born in Toronto, Ontario. He began his career in 1953, appearing in the television series Encounter. In 1956, Washbrook starred in the western television series My Friend Flicka, which aired on CBS. After the series ended, Washbrook guest-starred in television programs including Trackdown, The Donna Reed Show, My Three Sons, Wagon Train, The Millionaire, Perry Mason and Dr. Kildare. He also played the recurring role of Eddy Burke in Hazel.

Washbrook appeared in three films: Lonelyhearts, A Nightingale Sang in Berkeley Square and The Space Children, in which he co-starred and played the role of Tim Gamble.

References

External links 

Rotten Tomatoes profile

1944 births
Living people
Male actors from Toronto
Canadian emigrants to the United States
American male child actors
American male film actors
American male television actors
Canadian male child actors
Canadian male film actors
Canadian male television actors
20th-century American male actors
21st-century American male actors
20th-century Canadian male actors
21st-century Canadian male actors
Western (genre) television actors